During the 1976 Summer Olympics held in Montréal in Canada, the Tunisian team initially competed but then joined a boycott by all but two African nations. The boycott was called due to the International Olympic Committee (IOC) allowing the New Zealand team to participate despite the recent tour of South Africa by the country's rugby union team. Sporting contact with South Africans was banned by the IOC as a consequence of the system of apartheid operated in the country.

Athletes from Cameroon, Egypt, Morocco, and Tunisia competed during the first three days of the Games, from 18 to 20 July, before withdrawing from the Olympics, joining a total of 33 countries mainly from Africa in the boycott.

Boxing

Men

Handball

Men's Team Competition
 Mohamed Abdel Khaled
 Khaled Achour
 Habib Ammar
 Ahmed Bechir Bel Hadj
 Abderraouf Ben Samir
 Moncef Besbes
 Raouf Chabchoub
 Slaheddine Deguechi
 Mohamed Naceur Jelili
 Mounir Jelili
 Habib Kheder
 Lotfi Rebai

Group B

 Tunisia withdrew after 2 matches. The results were annulled.

Swimming

Men

Women

References

Official Olympic Reports
sports-reference

1976 in Tunisian sport
Nations at the 1976 Summer Olympics
1976